Sledging can mean:

Sledding or sleighing
Sledging (cricket), verbal abuse or comments meant to intimidate or put off an opposing batsman in cricket.
Sledging (bodyboarding)